Photon sphere (definition):
A photon sphere of a static spherically symmetric metric is a timelike hypersurface  if the deflection angle of a light ray with the closest distance of approach  diverges as 

For a general static spherically symmetric metric

the photon sphere equation is:

The concept of a photon sphere in a static spherically metric was generalized to a photon surface of any metric.

Photon surface (definition) : 
A photon surface of (M,g) is an immersed, nowhere spacelike hypersurface S of (M, g) such that, for every point p∈S and every null vector k∈TpS, there exists a null geodesic :(-ε,ε)→M of (M,g) such that (0)=k, |γ|⊂S.

Both definitions give the same result for a general static spherically symmetric metric.

Theorem:
Subject to an energy condition, a black hole in any spherically symmetric spacetime must be surrounded by a photon sphere. Conversely, subject to an energy condition, any photon sphere must cover more than a certain amount of matter, a black hole, or a naked singularity.

References

Black holes
General relativity